Midline-2 is a protein that in humans is encoded by the MID2 gene.

Function 

The protein encoded by this gene is a member of the tripartite motif (TRIM) family. The TRIM motif includes three zinc-binding domains, a RING, a B-box type 1 and a B-box type 2, and a coiled-coil region. The protein localizes to microtubular structures in the cytoplasm. Its function has not been identified. Alternate splicing of this gene results in two transcript variants encoding different isoforms.

Recent reports indicate the involvement of MID2 in cytokinesis .MID2 (TRIM1) ubiquitinates Sperm-associated antigen 5 (Astrin) on K409, further promoting its degradation and proper cytokinesis. In contrary, depletion of MID2 (TRIM1) stabilizes Sperm-associated antigen 5 (Astrin) whose inappropriate accumulation at the midbody triggers cytokinetic arrest, multinucleated cells, and cell death.

Interactions 

MID2 has been shown to interact with MID1.

MID2 (TRIM1) interacts with Leucine-rich repeat kinase 2 (LRRK2), which is often subject to missense mutations in familial Parkinson's disease (PD). MID2 (TRIM1) specifically binds to the flexible regulatory loop of LRRK2853–981. MID2 (TRIM1) recruits LRRK2 to the microtubule cytoskeleton where MID2 (TRIM1) ubiquitinates LRRK2 targeting it for proteasomal degradation.

References

Further reading